The 1914 Georgia Bulldogs football team represented the Georgia Bulldogs of the University of Georgia during the 1914 Southern Intercollegiate Athletic Association football season. The Bulldogs completed the season with a 3–5–1 record.   In addition to losing four-year letterman and All-American Bob McWhorter, Georgia also lost more than ten experienced players.  The inexperience showed in lopsided losses to North Carolina, Virginia and Clemson.  The season ended on a positive note with a tie between Georgia and undefeated Auburn.  Quarterback David Paddock was also selected as an All-American in 1914.

Schedule

References

Georgia
Georgia Bulldogs football seasons
Georgia Bulldogs football